Dominican Republic competed in the 2015 Parapan American Games.

Competitors
The following table lists the Dominican delegation by sport and gender.

Medalists

Athletics

Men

Cycling

 Road

 Track

Table tennis

Men

See also
Dominican Republic at the 2016 Summer Paralympics
Dominican Republic at the 2015 Pan American Games

References

2015 in Dominican Republic sport
Nations at the 2015 Parapan American Games
Dominican Republic at the Pan American Games